Joanne Lee Molinaro (born April 24, 1979) is an American attorney, and vegan author and blogger. Widely known as the Korean Vegan, Molinaro started her food blog in 2016, and began posting videos of her cooking and life stories in 2017. As of April 2021, she has over 500,000 subscribers on YouTube and over 3 million followers on TikTok.

Early life and education 
Joanne Lee was born on April 24, 1979, in Chicago, Illinois. Her parents were born in present-day North Korea, and escaped when they were young. She was raised in Skokie, Illinois, and has a younger brother named Jaesun. She earned a bachelor's degree in English from the University of Illinois at Urbana-Champaign, and a Juris Doctor from the University of Chicago Law School.

Career

Attorney 
Molinaro is a firm partner at Foley & Lardner LLP's office in Chicago. She is a member of multiple practice groups in the firm, including Bankruptcy & Business Reorganizations. As a specialized practitioner in bankruptcy, she defended the liquidating trustee against almost $1 billion in claims in the second-largest Ponzi scheme case in United States history. She has also prosecuted frauds, avoidance actions, and breaches.

Vegan blogger
Molinaro started her food blog, The Korean Vegan, in 2016, shortly after adopting a vegan diet. Her blog consists of re-imagining traditional Korean meals by making plant-based adaptations. She began posting to the popular social network TikTok in 2020 under the same name. On the platform, she shares recipes along with personal stories about her and her family. Some of the stories she shares include how her family escaped North Korea and adjusted to life in the United States, how it feels to be a Korean woman living in the diaspora, her law journey, and her abusive first marriage. She also shares life lessons on love, trust, and self-confidence, and discussions on racism, sexism, and xenophobia. She has been featured in numerous publications, including CNN, CBS, The Atlantic, and the Food Network.

Personal life 
Molinaro resides in Chicago. She is fluent in English and Korean. Her hobbies include reading and running, and she has run several half and full marathons.

Shortly after graduating law school, Molinaro married her first husband. While his name is unknown to the public, she has described the marriage as emotionally abusive. They have since divorced. On July 21, 2018, she married Chicago-born concert pianist and music professor Anthony Molinaro in Rome.

Selected publications 

 The Korean Vegan Cookbook: Reflections and Recipes from Omma's Kitchen (Penguin Publishing Group, October 2021)

References

External links

Living people
1979 births
People from Chicago
People from Skokie, Illinois
American veganism activists
American writers of Korean descent
21st-century American women writers
21st-century American women lawyers
University of Illinois Urbana-Champaign alumni
University of Chicago Law School alumni
21st-century American lawyers
Chefs of vegan cuisine
Lawyers from Chicago
Writers from Chicago
Women cookbook writers
Women food writers
American women bloggers
American bloggers
American YouTubers
Vegan cookbook writers
American TikTokers